Stefano Pozzolini (born 31 July 1977 in Genoa) is an Italian snowboarder. He competed in the men's snowboard cross event at the 2006 Winter Olympics, placing 24th, and the 2010 Winter Olympics, placing fourteenth.

References

1977 births
Living people
Italian male snowboarders
Olympic snowboarders of Italy
Snowboarders at the 2006 Winter Olympics
Snowboarders at the 2010 Winter Olympics
21st-century Italian people